Peripatetic may refer to:

Peripatetic school, a school of philosophy in Ancient Greece
Peripatetic axiom
Peripatetic minority, a mobile population moving among settled populations offering a craft or trade.
Peripatetic Jats, an ethnic group in Afghanistan
 Peripatetic teacher, a traveling schoolteacher